The Waipara River is a river in Canterbury in the South Island of New Zealand.

The river passes through the small town of Waipara on its  southeastward journey to the Pacific Ocean at the northern end of Pegasus Bay near Amberley.

See also
List of rivers of New Zealand

References

Hurunui District
Rivers of Canterbury, New Zealand
Rivers of New Zealand